Jofa, originally short for Jonssons Fabriker (Jonsson's Factories) is a maker of sporting equipment for sports such as ice hockey, bandy, and horseback riding, based in Malung, Sweden.

History
Niss Oskar Jonsson founded Jofa in 1926. It can be considered an offspring of the hide industry in Malung; the company's first products were made out of leftovers from the hide industry, and the first factory was located in an old tannery.

During World War II Jofa grew because of large orders on tents and uniforms from the Swedish military.

Jofa was a subsidiary of Volvo 1973-1985 and in 1989 the company was bought by Karhu Canada Inc. Jofa was acquired in 1998 by SLM International, today known as CCM.

Niss Oskar Jonsson, the founder of Jofa, died in 2002 at the age of 92 years.

Bandy
Jofa manufactures bandy equipment such as bandy sticks, bandy balls, clothes and helmets.

Hockey
The first step towards their most successful product was taken in 1963, when they started making hockey helmets. They have also manufactured other ice hockey equipment, such as ice skates and hockey sticks. Known NHL players who used Jofa helmets include such stars as Wayne Gretzky, Jaromír Jágr, Mario Lemieux, Jari Kurri, Marty McSorley, Claude Lemieux, Mats Sundin, Markus Näslund, Peter Forsberg, Phil Housley, Teemu Selänne, Esa Tikkanen, Daniel Sedin and his brother Henrik Sedin. In Roller Hockey, Daniel Campoverde and other players also used Jofa helmets.

Reebok has phased out the use of the Jofa brand on its hockey equipment, in favour of its core CCM and Rbk brands.  The Rbk brand has subsequently been changed to Reebok Hockey.

Despite not producing hockey equipment since the 2004 Reebok buyout, Teemu Selänne was the only player in the NHL that continued to wear a Jofa helmet: a Jofa 366 with the Jofa logo blacked-out due to an expired licensing agreement with the NHL.
Subsequent to Selänne's retirement after the Ducks' elimination in the 2014 Stanley Cup playoffs, there are no longer any NHL players that wear a Jofa helmet.

References

External links

Home page of Jofa

Sportswear brands
Sporting goods brands
Swedish brands
Ice hockey brands
Bandy brands
Sporting goods manufacturers of Sweden